Kudeh (also Romanized as Kūdeh; also known as Do Ābsar) is a village in Taher Gurab Rural District, in the Central District of Sowme'eh Sara County, Gilan Province, Iran. At the 2006 census, its population was 475, in 158 families.

References 

Populated places in Sowme'eh Sara County